Delphine and Muriel Coulin are French sisters who form a directing duo. They are best known for their film 17 Girls.

Early career
Muriel Coulin began work as a cinematographer and camera assistant throughout the 1990s. Delphine is also a novelist. The sisters began collaborating on films in 1997 with the short film Il faut imaginer Sisyphe heureux (a reference to Albert Camus' The Myth of Sisyphus).

Film career
The sisters made their feature film debut in 2011 with the film 17 Girls which was loosely based on the story of a group of American teenage girls who decided to become pregnant at the same time. The film played at the 2011 Cannes Film Festival.

In 2015 the sisters announced that their second film would be The Stopover, starring actress/singer Soko. The film premiered at the 2016 Cannes Film Festival in the Un Certain Regard section. They jointly won the award for Best Screenplay from the Un Certain Regard jury.

Filmography
Il faut imaginer Sisyphe heureux (1997)
 17 Girls (2011)
The Stopover (2016)

Bibliography
 Les Traces, Éditions Grasset, 2004 
 Une seconde de plus, Éditions Grasset, 2006 
 Les mille-vies, Éditions du Seuil, 2008 
 Samba pour la France, Éditions du Seuil, 2011  - Prix du roman métis des lycéens
 Voir du pays, Éditions Grasset, 2013 
 Une Fille dans la jungle, Éditions Grasset et Fasquelle, 2017 
 Loin, à l'ouest, Editions Grasset & Fasquelle, 2021

Awards
 Prix du roman métis des lycéens 2011 for Samba pour la France

References

External links
 

Sibling filmmakers
Sibling duos
French women film directors
Living people
People from Hennebont
French women screenwriters
French screenwriters
French women cinematographers
French women novelists
Year of birth missing (living people)